Lindia is a genus of rotifers belonging to the family Lindiidae.

The genus has almost cosmopolitan distribution.

Species:
 Lindia anebodica Bērziņš, 1949 
 Lindia annecta Harring & Myers, 1922

References

Rotifer genera
Ploima